Judelin Aveska (born October 21, 1987 in Port-Margot) is a Haitian football defender.

 
He scored his only goal for national team against Antigua and Barbuda on 15 November 2011 at Stade Sylvio Cator

References

External links

BDFA profile 

1987 births
Living people
People from Nord (Haitian department)
Haitian footballers
Haitian expatriate footballers
Haiti international footballers
Club Atlético River Plate footballers
Independiente Rivadavia footballers
Club Almagro players
Santiago Morning footballers
Primera B de Chile players
Expatriate footballers in Argentina
Expatriate footballers in Chile
Expatriate footballers in Ecuador
Haitian expatriate sportspeople in Argentina
Haitian expatriate sportspeople in Chile
Haitian expatriate sportspeople in Ecuador
Association football defenders
2009 CONCACAF Gold Cup players
2013 CONCACAF Gold Cup players
2014 Caribbean Cup players
2015 CONCACAF Gold Cup players
Copa América Centenario players
Haitian expatriate sportspeople in India